is a Japanese tokusatsu television series. First created in 1988 by Toho, the show was an attempt to create a Tokusatsu series using a Super Sentai motif, but the idea was dropped after the unaired pilot. The series itself still slightly resembled a sentai show, with most of the protagonists wearing color-coordinated armor. The show was broadcast on NTV and aired from October 2, 1988, to July 5, 1989. It also aired in Brazil via the Rede Manchete stations back in 1990.

Story

In 1999, crime has overrun Tokyo. Hopelessly outmanned and outgunned, the Tokyo Metropolitan Police Force decides to set up a special taskforce to combat the crime. Codenamed “ZAC” (Zero-Section Armed Constable), this police department is designed for special missions and its members are known as "Cybercops". For this cause, the police scientists developed the "Bit Suits", three high-powered armors outfitted with the latest technology: Mars, Saturn and Mercury. In the first episode, a mysterious young man, Shinya Takeda, appears from nowhere and saves the day after using his own armor, the Jupiter Bit Suit. Following his victory, he joins ZAC in battling Death Trap, a nefarious organization ruled by the ruthless Baron Kageyama, whose goal is to use the computers' will-power to gain world domination and appears to be mysteriously linked to Takeda's past. The Death Trap uses powerful robots to reach his goals, but the Cybercops always defeat them.
During the battles against the enemies, Jupiter bit by bit increases his mysterious power and reveals a secret: he was found unconscious by the Interpol wearing his own armor. Shinya Takeda has amnesia; despite this, he receives the support and the friendship of the others ZAC members (except for Akira, that is jealous and critical of Takeda).
The union between the ZAC members blossoms more and more. The ZAC remains a powerhouse until they encounter Lucifer, a Death Trap ally that is Jupiter's rival. He is the first enemy that can defeat Jupiter and the other Cybercops. In fact, he almost kills Jupiter.
During the battles against the ZAC, Lucifer reveals why he hates Jupiter; according to him, they both came from the future and were allies in the war between the human kind and the computers, but Jupiter would have betrayed the humans. Because of the amnesia, Jupiter doesn't know whether or not what Lucifer said was true, and decides to fight him to the death. In the middle of the fight, however, Jupiter remembers the truth: including Jupiter and Lucifer, there were three men that came form the future; the third man was Baron Kageyama, a traitor. Henceforth, Lucifer allied with the ZAC. He doesn't join the ZAC, but from time to time, he helps the Cybercops. Many times, he prevents the ZAC from losing battles.
After an innumerable amount of battles, Lucifer and the ZAC defeat Baron Kageyama by causing a great explosion that came from laser power. Kageyama reveals his purpose for technological world domination, which was to help the world avoid an anthropogenic environmental collapse. Thus, Jupiter and Lucifer return to their time and Tomoko (who loves Jupiter) decides to go with them. The ZAC saved the world.

Characters

Shinya Takeda/Jupiter: An amnesiac found by the Interpol rescue team, Takeda was assigned to ZAC due to him donning the Jupiter Bit Suit (an advanced version of the newly designed Bit Suits) and in hopes of unraveling his past. While he has a very sunny disposition and is often very fun-loving, he has a considerable temper that can escalate into a “battle rage” when fighting opponents. When this happens, Jupiter is able to summon his own Cyber Arm, the Cyber Thunder Arm, and the Cyber Shield through a process called Cyber Boming, which ultimately destroys his enemies. Later, it is revealed that Takeda is a time traveller from the 23rd century (a future where the sentient machines waged war against humans) and was brought to 1999 by a time-space portal rift opened after the Babylon Tower (an strategical machine HQ) was blown up. Along with him, Lucifer and Kageyama were also transported. His original codename was "Z226" (Z-Double Two Six) "Shinya Takeda" is a name invented by the Interpol. His Jupiter Bit Suit, as well as the Cyber Thunder Arm came with him to the past. In the end of the series, he goes back to the 23rd century with Lucifer and Tomoko, who asks to go with them to fight for a better time. In fact, Takeda is in love with Tomoko: they almost kissed twice, but were interrupted by Akira and were embarrassed.
Tomoko Uesugi: Backup ZAC officer for the Cybercop. Due to financial problems (both within the show and with Toho in real life), her armor, Venus Bit, was never built. Monitors and assists with the maintenance of Cybernation and Black Chamber systems. Falls in love with Takeda and accompanies him back to the 23rd century by the end of the series. Carries the standard ZAC firearm, the S.D. Gun. She is young, beautiful and affectionate and has a great influence on the other members of Zac. She is the only one who can lead you to teamwork. So often the Cybercops can only win because of Tomoko's leadership.
Akira Houjyo/Mars: The team leader, Akira's father committed suicide when he was 8 years old, making him to become rebellious and to use his intelligence to hack the system of the enterprise in which his father worked in, eventually bankrupting it. After that, he was practically raised by Captain Oda, who wished to use the kid's high capacity for something beneficial. Cool under pressure and has a strong sense of duty and honor. Became top of his class at the Police Academy and was formerly an elite officer with the Tokyo Police Department. His armor is designed specifically to provide heavy artillery and firearms support. Due to the size of his suit, is one of the slower units and hampers Hojyo's movements a bit. His armor is outfitted with “Stabilize Gear”, which brace his armor when he uses his heavy guns.
Ryoichi Mouri/Saturn: A happy-go-lucky and a jokester, Mori is the team's resident “mood maker”. He does not enjoy fighting, eventually doing it because of his duties. He has a younger brother and three younger sisters. His armor is equipped with numerous sensory and communication equipment which help aid the team in tracking down enemies and collecting data. His helmet antenna and his shoulder parabola sonar units can perform a wide range of surveillance, reconnaissance and tracking duties, making it the most vulnerable Bit Suit.
Osamu Saiyonji/Mercury: Sayionji's is the resident hand-to-hand combat specialist. His brother was also a cop, as Osamu always wanted to follow his steps. However, his brother was killed in action while investigating a case. From that point on, Osamu's mother tried to preserve him from the danger and risks of being a cop. Despite his moments of conflict, Osamu is very brave and has a great fighting spirit. His armor is the most lightweight of the armors and affords him extreme flexibility in movement and speed albeit at the cost of defense and protection. His unit is the fastest of the “Cyber Bit” armors and he can travel at incredible speeds (his unit is equipped with air brakes which aid him in stopping). The skates can be controlled via brainwave controls in the Bit Suit helmet.
Lucifer: Takeda's ex-partner in the future, was also transported with him and Kageyama to the 20th century through the same time-space portal. At first, his only wish is to avenge his dead comrades, targeting Jupiter as his nemesis and challenging him to a death confront. He allies with Baron Kageyama believing Takeda was the traitor who murdered his companions. Eventually, it is revealed that Kageyama was the mole. From then, Lucifer decides to aid the Cybercops without joining the group, helping them in battle more often than not. Lucifer's bit, along with Jupiter's, is the most powerful of the Bit Suits, as it is more equipped and enhanced than the others. Armed with two high-power pistols called Impulse Magnum, two machine-guns which come from his back to shoulders, the Pulsar Cannon, Gigamax and the Cyber Graviton, an energy absorber-releaser on his chest.

Other ZAC Members

Captain Hisayoshi Oda: Sometimes strictly wrapped around young men who are kind and gently give instructions. Because of their personality the members' trust is also thick. Sometimes you say a cold pun.
Shimazu Mizue: Second In Command. ZAC 's secretary and cap representative. She support Oda and sometimes take command when Oda is absent. There used to be a past where she became love with a bit suit researcher, but he is a victim of a missile that hit the laboratory. She is about ZAC's work which uses a bit suit to say also as his child through single bachelors.
Daisuke Yazawa: ZAC computer operator. He gather information and analyze, and assist strategy. Abundant knowledge of computer and science.
Miho Asakura: Communication officer of ZAC. Natural blur. The way of speaking has a slightly lingering impression. An ordinary girl who will always run away against the ZAC's duty to throw out his life.

Death Trap
The goals of the Death Trap organization are to eliminate all humankind on Earth and supplant the world with computer and silicon lifeforms.

Led by the maniacal and crazed computer program “Führer” Soutou (Despot Führer), the “Death Trap” launches a number of terrorist attacks against Tokyo, using its army of “Death Droids” and battle mecha.

It is later revealed that the “Despot Führer” was in actuality a computer entity from the 23rd century which was sent back in time to usurp control of the world. The computer was built by a human - future criminal mastermind Baron Kageyama, who planned on ruling the world by taking over the past. Baron Kageyama, who had also created Madame Durwin, Einstein, Ploid and Luna, later merges himself with Despot Führer to become a superhuman entity.

The “Death Trap” consists of three crime organizations listed below.  All of their leaders turn out to be androids created by Baron Kageyama.

The Ominous Gang
Led by the evil criminal Professor Einstein, his gang consists of specially designed black armored Ominous Death Droids which can be customized with a number of deadly weapon attachments. Prof. Einstein's brain was transplanted with the brain of a leading Hi-Tech/Cybernetics expert. Using this newfound knowledge he is able to unlock the mysteries of “Super Physics” (Cho Rion Butsuri) to modify his Ominous droids.

The Harkos Gang
Led by the feline-like Madam Durwin who commands the ghostly white Harcross Death Droids. These can also be outfitted with a number of deadly weapon attachments affording them a great deal of versatility and customization. Durwin was an expert in biology and genetics. Thus her name, which was a play of Charles Darwin, a famous naturalist.
 
Durwin was ordered to destroy the train tracks which the Cybercops were also traveling on with Luna, after learning Luna was an android. As Durwin warned Luna, Luna was nevertheless killed by baron Kageyama, who showed puzzlement over why his most beautiful creation would betray him. Luna said: "You could never understand the feelings of a puppet! You became a doll without human feelings!" After Luna exploded, the Baron confessed he loved her, as it's impossible to be a perfect doll by not having feelings and by thus being dangerous.

The Garoga Gang
Led by the hulking Doctor Arthur Ploid, his Garogoid (Hie Ningen Gata Mecha <Non-Humanoid Mecha>) army is composed of monstrous mecha creations and robots. His brain was replaced with a leading expert in psychology Arthur C. Ploid, a scientist who died in 1937. Ploid is a specialist in grand scale attacks and psychological warfare. He carries an electrified whip.

Others
Later yet another gang is incorporated into the “Death Trap”:

Beast Master Luna and The Four Kings
Luna is Professor Enstein's sister. She managed to avenge her brother's death at the hands of the Cybercops. Luna had assembled four super soldiers who would help her defeat the CyberCops:

 Tiger – armed with razor sharp boomerangs which he could use to behead his enemies.
 Salamander – who was armed with an electric charged whip.
 Turtle – who had superhuman strength and the ability to emit fire bursts.
 Hawk – a master martial artist whose hands and feet were armed with razors.

She later fell in love with Akira, who is her brother's rival, only to discover after joining him that she was an android and all her memories were false. Luna died protecting Akira from an energy blast by Baron Kageyama.

Episode list
Episode 14 ended up airing on January 15, 1989, because Emperor Shōwa died on January 7; and on April 5, the day that Episode 25 aired, the show began airing on Wednesdays instead of Sundays.
 (Original Airdate: October 2, 1988)
 (Original Airdate: October 9, 1988)
 (Original Airdate: October 16, 1988)
 (Original Airdate: October 23, 1988)
 (Original Airdate: October 30, 1988)
 (Original Airdate: November 6, 1988)
 (Original Airdate: November 13, 1988)
 (Original Airdate: November 20, 1988)
 (Original Airdate: November 27, 1988)
 (Original Airdate: December 4, 1988)
 (Original Airdate: December 11, 1988)
  (Original Airdate: December 18, 1988)
 (Original Airdate: December 25, 1988)
 (Original Airdate: January 15, 1989)
 (Original Airdate: January 22, 1989)
 (Original Airdate: January 29, 1989)
 (Original Airdate: February 5, 1989)
 (Original Airdate: February 12, 1989)
 (Original Airdate: February 19, 1989)
  (Original Airdate: February 26, 1989)
 (Original Airdate: March 5, 1989)
 (Original Airdate: March 12, 1989)
 (Original Airdate: March 19, 1989)
 (Original Airdate: March 26, 1989)
  (Original Airdate: April 5, 1989)
 (Original Airdate: April 12, 1989)
 (Original Airdate: April 19, 1989)
 (Original Airdate: April 26, 1989)
 (Original Airdate: May 10, 1989)
 (Original Airdate: May 17, 1989)
 (Original Airdate: May 24, 1989)
 (Original Airdate: May 31, 1989)
 (Original Airdate: June 7, 1989)
 (Original Airdate: June 14, 1989)
 (Original Airdate: June 28, 1989)
 (Original Airdate: July 5, 1989)

Cast

Shinya Takeda/Jupiter: Tomonori Yoshida
Tomoko Uesugi: Mika Chiba
Fake Tomoko Uesugi (19): Mika Chiba
Akira Hojyo/Mars: Shogo Shiotani
Ryoichi Mori/Saturn: Tom Saeba (credited as Ryuji Mizumoto)
Osamu Saionji/Mercury: Ryoma Sasaki
Lucifer: Takashi Koura
Captain Hisayoshi Oda: Masaaki Daimon
Fake Captain Oda (6): Masaaki Daimon
Lt. Shimazu Mizue: Atsuko Mita
Daisuke Yazawa: Shuhei Suzuki
Miho Asakura: Hiromi Onishi
Baron Kageyama: Junya Sato
Dr. Ploid: Ken Okabe
Mme. Durwin/Harkos (voice): Tomoko Ishimura
Dr. Einstein/Ominos (voice) (1-24): Takeshi Hayashi
Luna/Ominos (voice) (25-34): Masako Takeda
Führer/Narrator: Goro Mutsumi
ZAC's Syntheised Speech: Tembaro Baba

Guest Stars
Cops (1): Saburo Ishikura, Mitsuhiro Takeda
Lighthouse Attendant (2): Chafurin
President Ryuichi Kaido (3): Sei Hiraizumi
Reporter (3): Aruno Tahara
Reiko Ando (4): Shiho Wada
Prince Rolan (5): Roger Allen Hamrick
Kindergarten Bus' Criminals (7): Makoto Kakeda and Ryo Yamada
Wolf (7): Ulf Otsuki
Osamu's Mother (8, 32): Kumiko Kishi
Maki Ichijo (9): Masako Shiozawa
Dr. Yamamoto (9, 11, 17, 33–34): Akira Otani
Alisa (11): Kurumi Wakuseiji
Koichi Tachibana (12): Takeshi Iwase
Akemi/Fake Akemi (13): Natsumi Nanase
Elder Cid (16): Ichiro Izawa
Kirara (16): Hiroko Ichikawa
Rampage Jack/Fake Rampage Jack (Efta Harkos' human form) (16): Kazutoshi Yokoyama
Police University Female Dormitory's Director (19): Nadeshiko Yamato
Police Officer (19): Daisuke Ijima
Misako Saegusa (20): Rie Hirakata 
Pai Lo (23): Jyunichi Haruta
Satoru (26): Yousuke Iizuka
Yukari (26): Yuko Honna
Kazumi Mori (27, 30,32): Rika Abiko
Naomi Mori (27, 30, 32): Mayumi Muto
Kenji Mori (27, 30, 32): Daisuke Kurosawa
Kumi Mori (27, 30, 32): Ayagi Aragaki
Mamoru (28): Toshiharu Shinohara
Kazuo Hasegawa (29): So Furukawa
Hustler (human form, ep 31): Toshimichi Takahashi

Stunt
 Mars (sub)/Efta Harkos: Kazutoshi Yokoyama
 Jupiter: Richii Seike
 Deathtrap's soldiers and monsters: Koichi Kayama, Takashi Sakamoto, Tokio Iwata, Takayuki Ishii, Yasuhiko Imai, Eichi Takagi and Hiromitsu Miyamoto

Songs
Opening theme

Lyrics: 
Composition: 
Arrangement: 
Artist: 
Ending theme
 (1–33, 35–36)
Lyrics: 
Composition: 
Arrangement: Yuji Toriyama
Artist: 
"Brand New Tomorrow" (34)
Lyrics: Shun Taguchi
Composition: VAX POP
Arrangement: 
Artist: Mika Chiba

References

1988 Japanese television series debuts
1989 Japanese television series endings
Nippon TV original programming
Tokusatsu television series
Toho tokusatsu
Takara Tomy